The Antillean cave rail (Nesotrochis debooyi), also known as DeBooy's rail, is an extinct species of flightless bird which occurred on Puerto Rico and the United States Virgin Islands. Bone fragments of this species were first unearthed by archaeologist Theodoor de Booy in kitchen midden deposits on the Richmond estate near Christiansted, U.S. Virgin Islands in July 1916 and described by Alexander Wetmore in 1918. The Antillean cave rail might have become extinct before the arrival of the Europeans but stories heard by Alexander Wetmore on Puerto Rico in 1912 about an easy-to-catch bird named carrao might refer to this species. The Antillean cave rail was flightless and was hunted as food by the aborigines.

References
Wetmore, A. (1918): Bones of birds collected by Theodoor de Booy from Kitchen Midden deposits in the islands of St. Thomas and St. Croix
Olson, S. L. (1974): A new species of Nesotrochis from Hispaniola, with notes on other fossil rails from the West Indies (Aves: Rallidae)

External links
The Auk Vol. 55 (1938), p. 51: Bird remains from the West Indies by Alexander Wetmore
Catalogue of Fossil birds by Pierce Brodkorb Part 3 - Family Rallidae p. 127
Bird remains from the caves of Porto Rico. Bulletin of the AMNH ; v. 46, article 4., 1922

Rallidae
Holocene extinctions
Birds described in 1918
Extinct birds of the Caribbean
Extinct flightless birds
Fossil taxa described in 1918
Taxa named by Alexander Wetmore